The 2006 AHA Men's Ice Hockey Tournament was the 3rd Atlantic Hockey Men's Ice Hockey Tournament. It was played between March 11 and March 18, 2006. Opening round games were played at home team campus sites, while the semifinals and championship games were played at the Holy Cross home venue: Hart Center in Worcester, Massachusetts. By winning the tournament, Holy Cross received the Atlantic Hockey Association's automatic bid to the 2006 NCAA Division I Men's Ice Hockey Tournament. This was the final year in which the AHA championship game was played at a non-neutral site.

Format
The tournament featured three rounds of play. All games in the tournament are single-elimination. In the quarterfinals, the first and eighth seeds, the second and seventh seeds, the third and sixth seeds and the fourth and fifth seeds play to determine who advances to the semifinals. of the four remaining teams, the highest and lowest remaining ranked teams play each other with the other two teams facing one another to determine the championship participants. The tournament champion receives an automatic bid to the 2006 NCAA Men's Division I Ice Hockey Tournament.

Conference standings
Note: GP = Games played; W = Wins; L = Losses; T = Ties; PTS = Points; GF = Goals For; GA = Goals Against

Bracket
Teams are reseeded after the Quarterfinals

Note: * denotes overtime period(s)

Quarterfinals

(1) Holy Cross vs. (8) American International

(2) Mercyhurst vs. (7) Canisius

(3) Sacred Heart vs. (6) Connecticut

(4) Bentley vs. (5) Army

Semifinals

(1) Holy Cross vs. (6) Connecticut

(2) Mercyhurst vs. (4) Bentley

Championship

(1) Holy Cross vs. (4) Bentley

Tournament awards

All-Tournament Team
G: Tony Quesada (Holy Cross)
D: Jaye Judd (Bentley)
D: Jamie Hunt (Mercyhurst)
F: Tom Dickhudt (Bentley)
F: Pierre Napert-Frenette (Holy Cross)
F: James Sixsmith (Holy Cross)

MVP
James Sixsmith (Holy Cross)

References

Aha tournament
Atlantic Hockey Tournament